Grant Williams (born 15 November 1969) is a former Australian rules footballer who played for Melbourne in the Australian Football League (AFL) in 1992. He was recruited from the Sandy Bay Football Club in the Tasmanian Football League (TFL) with the 9th selection in the 1991 Mid-year Draft. He later returned to Tasmania and played for the Burnie Dockers.

References

External links

Living people
1969 births
Melbourne Football Club players
Sandy Bay Football Club players
Burnie Dockers Football Club players
Burnie Hawks Football Club players
Australian rules footballers from Tasmania